Desert Tech is a rifle manufacturer founded in 2007 as Desert Tactical Arms and later re-branded as Desert Tech in 2013. They are located in West Valley City, Utah. As of May 2018 all of their firearms are rifles with a bullpup design. Desert Tech's motto is "Tomorrow's Weapons". They make three different styles of rifle, the SRS, HTI, and MDRx. Desert Tech's claim to fame is that all of their chassis are multi caliber and easily changeable from one caliber to another.

In July 2019, federal prosecutors gave notice that they intend to seize a building Desert Tech is renting for some of their operations.  However, Desert Tech is not the owner of the building, and no official attempt has ever materialized.

Donald Trump Jr was shown in a promotion for Desert Tech on July 24, 2020 with the company's founder, Nicholas Young, and firing the company's sniper rifles. A marketing video on YouTube also includes an image of Trump Jr.

Products
Desert Tech HTI (Hard Target Interdiction) Available in .375 Cheytac, .408 Cheytac, .416 Barrett, and .50 BMG
Desert Tech SRS-A2 (Stealth Recon Scout) Available in .260 Rem., 6.5 CM, .6.5 LM, .308 Win., 300 WM, 300WSM, and 338 LM
Desert Tech SRS-A2 Covert a shorter variant of the SRS-A1 Available in .260 Rem., 6.5 mm CM, 6.5 mm LM, .308 Win., .300 WM, .300 WSM, and .338 LM
Desert Tech MDR (Micro Dynamic Rifle) Available in .308 Win/7.62 mm, and .223/5.56 mm/.223 Wylde
Desert Tech MDRx (Micro Dynamic Rifle eXtreme) Available in .308 Win/7.62 mm, .223/5.56 mm/.223 Wylde, 6.5mm Creedmoor, and .300 BLK
Desert Tech Trasol 2.0 Trajectory Solution Software
Desert Tech Sound Suppressors  Available in .338 Win, .30 Caliber
Desert Tech 1X Reflex Red Dot Sight w/MDR Mount 
Desert Tech Ratchet Compensator Available in 5.56 mm/.223, 7.62 mm/3.08, and 6.5 mm Creedmoor  
Desert Tech Premium Match Ammunition  Available in .308 Win, .338 LM, .375 CT, .408 CT, .50 BMG, 6.5 mm Creedmoor

References

External links 

 Desert Tech, Utah gunmaker, turns down $15 million deal with Pakistan

Firearm manufacturers of the United States
Companies based in Utah
American companies established in 2007
West Valley City, Utah
2007 establishments in Utah